Mindanao Star Bus Transport, Incorporated (formerly Weena Express, People's Transport Corporation) is a bus line under the umbrella of Yanson Group of Bus Companies (YGBC). It operates bus transport services from Davao City, to Soccsksargen Region and the Island Garden City of Samal (through its sub-brand Island City Express), and has their own base in Ma-a, Davao City. Mindanao Star was once a part of Bachelor Express, but was later formed as an independent subsidiary of Yanson Group.

History 
It was established in 1980 as a Weena Express by its owner Mr. Bernardo "Digoy" M. Valdevieso. It pioneered bus services between Davao City and Cotabato City. It also has a sister company, named People's Transport Corporation, plying the same route.

Between 2002 and 2008, the bus line suffered bombings due to extortion attempts, which led to the company having financial problems. As early as 2007, Valdevieso already expressed his intent of selling the company to potential buyers saying that the attacks against his buses and terminals have proven to be burdensome to his financial standing.

After eight years of Valdevieso's struggle, on January 7, 2015, the company announced that it has been sold to Bachelor Express Incorporated. The company officially rebranded as Mindanao Star in mid-2015, with its first refurbished unit, number 15062, operated in June that year.

However, in the midst of their operation, Mindanao Star was separated from Bachelor Express and established their own subsidiary with the same name as their corporate branding, thus the Mindanao Star Bus Transport Incorporated. Their base which was once shared inside Bachelor Express' garage in Davao were lately moved to the former Weena Express' garage which is located near Bachelor's. They moved along with their new office and maintenance facilities.

In October 2015, Mindanao Star bought Holiday Bus, the bus line of Davao Holiday Transport Services Inc., plying the Davao City - General Santos route, and a competitor to Yellow Bus Line, Inc.

In April 2018, Mindanao Star bought Holiday Bus' sister company, Island City Express, plying the Davao City - Island Garden City of Samal route. As part of the purchase contract, the Island City Express name was retained.

Since August 2019, Mindanao Star operated city buses as part of Davao City's Peak-Hours Augmentation Bus Service program. It currently operates the Toril, Catalunan Grande and Cabantian routes.

Bases 
Their subsidiaries are sub-divided by bases. These are based on their area of their operation, and their base number shall be the prefix number for their bus fleets. Yanson Group started this practice in 2005 after they bought out Lilian Express Inc., and felt that re-organizing their company is needed.

There are two bases with one common base number under Mindanao Star:

Cotabato and Davao bases were once a facility of the former Weena Express. With the sold out, Yanson Group uses the garage as Base 15's field offices.

Provincial destinations

Cotabato base 
Cotabato base is located at Don Rufino Alonzo Avenue, Cotabato City, with its terminal hub at the same location. The base is assigned as Base 15 of Yanson Group of Bus Companies, a base that is commonly shared with their head office in Davao City. Their routes are from Cotabato City to several parts of Soccsksargen Region and the cities of Davao and Digos.
Cotabato City - Pigcawayan
 Cotabato City - Kabacan
 Cotabato City - Matalam
 Cotabato City - Kidapawan City
 Cotabato City - Digos
 Cotabato City - Davao City

Davao base 
Davao base is located at Bugac, Ma-a, Davao City, with its terminal hub at Davao City Overland Transport Terminal (Ecoland), Candelaria, Talomo, Davao City. The base is assigned as Base 15 of Yanson Group of Bus Companies, a base that is commonly shared with Cotabato City. Their routes are from Davao to Soccsksargen Region, while they also cater several routes from General Santos to its neighboring town and cities. The operation at General Santos was the result of their acquisition to Davao Holiday Bus Corporation. Meanwhile, as part of its acquisition of Island City Express, it also caters the inter-island service to Island Garden City of Samal.

As part of Davao City's Peak-Hours Augmentation Bus Service, it also operates city buses in Toril, Catalunan Grande and Cabantian.

 Provincial Routes
 Davao City – Kabacan
 Davao City – Kidapawan City
 Davao City – Midsayap
 Davao City – Marawi City via Iligan City
 Davao City – Bansalan via Santa Cruz
 Davao City – Koronadal via General Santos
 Davao City – Babak, Samal
 Davao City – Kaputian, Samal
 Davao City – Peñaplata, Samal
 General Santos – Davao City
 General Santos – Digos
 General Santos – Koronadal
 City Routes
 Toril - Roxas Avenue via Quimpo Boulevard / Matina / Ulas / Puan
 Catalunan Grande - Roxas Avenue via Matina / Bangkal / Skyline
 Cabantian - University of Mindanao (Bolton Campus) via Buhangin / J.P. Laurel Avenue / C. Bangoy St.

Gallery

See also
 Ceres Transport
 Davao Metro Shuttle
 Husky Tours
 Yellow Bus Line
 List of bus companies of the Philippines

References

External links
https://ygbc.com.ph

Bus companies of the Philippines
Transportation in Mindanao